Ilythea is a genus of shore flies in the family Ephydridae.

Species

I. argentata Canzoneri & Meneghini, 1969
I. caniceps Cresson, 1918
I. carlestolrai Canzoneri, 1993
I. cressoni Edwards, 1933
I. flaviceps Cresson, 1916
I. fusca Cresson, 1916
I. japonica Miyagi, 1977
I. mengalaensis Zhang & Yang, 2007
I. nebulosa Becker, 1908
I. niveoguttata Cresson, 1931
I. spilota (Curtis, 1832)
I. varipennis Oldenberg, 1923

References

Ephydridae
Taxa named by Alexander Henry Haliday
Brachycera genera
Diptera of Europe
Diptera of Africa
Diptera of Asia
Diptera of North America
Diptera of South America